Naiara is a feminine given name. Notable people with the name include:

Naiara Azevedo (born 1989), Brazilian singer-songwriter
Naiara Beristain (born 1992), Spanish football player 
Naiara Egozkue (born 1983), Spanish handball player
Naiara Telletxea (born 1984), Spanish road cyclist 

Feminine given names